Czech Republic–Vietnam relations are foreign relations between the Czech Republic and Vietnam.

History
The foreign relations between Czechoslovakia and Vietnam were established on February 2, 1950.

Migration

Vietnamese community in Czech Republic

As of 2018, there were 61,097 Vietnamese citizens with a residence permit in the Czech Republic, making them one of the largest immigrant groups in the country and the largest non-European group.

Czech community in Vietnam
Vietnam does not tell the number of foreign nationals per country in 2019 Census (it shows only 3,553 foreigners total ). In 2011, Committee on Foreign Affairs of Czech Parliament cited that "Czech community in Vietnam does not exist yet".

In September 2021, COVID-19 vaccination of Czech citizens living in Vietnam, organized by Czech Embassy in Hanoi, was attended by "almost 400" persons.

Trade and economy
In 2010s, Czech Republic and Vietnam consider each other as strategic markets with the aim to reach US$1 billion in two-way trade in the near future. As of 2015, Czech imports from Vietnam include seafood, farm produce such as coffee, tea and pepper. Vietnamese imports from the Czech republic are industrial goods, precision engineering, petrochemical equipment and energy.

One of the successful Czech companies in Vietnam is Home Credit.

Diplomatic missions

The Czech Republic has an embassy in Hanoi. There is an honorary consulate in Ho Chi Minh City.
Vietnam has an embassy in Prague.

See also
Foreign relations of the Czech Republic
Foreign relations of Vietnam
ASEAN–European Union relations
Vietnamese people in the Czech Republic
List of diplomatic missions of the Czech Republic
List of diplomatic missions of Vietnam

References

Notes

Further reading
Shoiw-Mei Tseng. Trade Flows between Czech Republic and East Asia (PFD full text). January 2013.

 
Czech Republic
Vietnam